Sucre Municipality is one of the 23 municipalities (municipios) that makes up the Venezuelan state of Mérida and, according to the 2011 census by the National Institute of Statistics of Venezuela, the municipality has a population of 24,509. Lagunillas is the municipal seat of the Sucre Municipality.

Name
The municipality is one of several in Venezuela named "Sucre Municipality" in honour of Venezuelan independence hero Antonio José de Sucre.

References

Municipalities of Mérida (state)